Stade Olympique Choletais is a French association football team founded in 1913. The club is based in Cholet, Pays de la Loire and play at Omnisports Stadium, which has a capacity of 9,000 spectators. They currently play in the Championnat National, the third tier of French football.

Current squad

Staff

 Benjamin Erisoglu – chairman
 Stéphane Rossi – head coach
 Nenad Zeković – assistant coach
 David Augereau – fitness coach
 Said Zaibila – goalkeeper coach

References

External links
SO Cholet official website 

Association football clubs established in 1913
1913 establishments in France
Sport in Cholet
Football clubs in Pays de la Loire